Clifton MacRae (30 November 1913 – 4 April 2000) was an Australian rules footballer who played with Footscray and Collingwood in the Victorian Football League (VFL).

MacRae, a half forward, was recruited to Footscray from the Werribee Football Club. He kicked five goals for Footscray in their 1938 semi final defeat to Collingwood, a club he crossed over to during the 1939 VFL season, after being dropped from the Footscray team. On his debut for Collingwood, against South Melbourne, he kicked another five goals haul. Two games later he was playing in the 1939 VFL Grand Final, as a half forward flanker. Collingwood lost by 53 points and he would never appear for the club again.

References

1913 births
Australian rules footballers from Victoria (Australia)
Western Bulldogs players
Collingwood Football Club players
2000 deaths